Poh is the tenth month of the Nanakshahi calendar, which governs the activities within Sikhism. This month coincides with Pausha in the Hindu calendar and the Indian national calendar, and December and January in the Gregorian and Julian calendars and is 30 days long.

See also
Punjabi calendar

References

External links
www.srigranth.org SGGS Page 133

Months of the Nanakshahi calendar
Sikh terminology